The 1987–88 UAE Football League was the 15th season of the UAE Football League which began in 1973. Twelve teams competed in the 1987–88 season with the teams playing against each other twice over the season. At the end of the season, it was Al Wasl FC that took out their fourth title finishing ten points ahead of second place Sharjah FC.

League standings

References
United Arab Emirates - List of final tables (RSSSF)

UAE Pro League seasons
United
1987–88 in Emirati football